Got the Magic is an album by the American jazz group Spyro Gyra. It was released in 1999 by Windham Hill Records.

Critical reception
AllMusic wrote that "mid- to up-tempo concoctions like 'Silk and Satin' and 'Havana Moonlight' make for some very pleasant listening, and the addition of old bandmate Dave Samuels' vibes on 'Breezeway' and 'Sierra' brings back the sound that attracted the group's audience in the first place."

Track listing 
 "Silk and Satin" (Chuck Loeb) – 5:31
 "Breezeway" (Jeremy Wall) – 4:49
 "Havana Moonlight" (Jay Beckenstein) – 4:54
 "Springtime Laughter" (Jeff Beal, Joan Beal) – 4:51
 "If You Will" (Beckenstein, Loeb) – 5:16
 "Got the Magic" (Julio Fernandez) – 4:26
 "Teardrops" (Beckenstein, Jason Miles) – 5:28
 "Pure Mood" (Loeb) – 5:58
 "Sierra" (Beckenstein) – 5:08
 "Love Comes" (Tom Schuman, Fernandez) – 4:47
 "R.S.V.P." (Scott Kreitzer, Randy Andos) – 4:27

Personnel 

Spyro Gyra
 Jay Beckenstein – saxophones
 Tom Schuman – keyboards
 Julio Fernandez – guitars, backing vocals (8, 9, 10), scat (9)
 Scott Ambush – bass guitar
 Joel Rosenblatt – drums

Additional musicians
 Jeff Beal – keyboards (4)
 Mike Ricchiuti – keyboards (11)
 Dave Charles – percussion
 Dave Samuels – vibraphone (2, 9), marimba (2, 9)
 Jason Miles – drum programming  (7)
 Scott Kreitzer – flute (1, 3, 6)
 Basia Trzetrzelewska – vocals (4)
 Billy Clif – backing vocals (6, 10)
 Andrika Hall – backing vocals (6, 10)
 Carmen Cuesta – backing vocals (8, 9)
 Philip Hamilton – backing vocals (8, 9)
 Kay Gile – backing vocals (10)

Production 
 Chuck Loeb – producer (1, 2, 5, 8, 9, 11)
 Jay Beckenstein – co-producer (1, 2, 5, 8, 9, 11), producer (3, 4, 6, 7, 10), executive producer 
 Jeremy Wall – co-producer (2, 3, 7)
 Julio Fernández – co-producer (3, 10), producer (6)
 Jeff Beal – producer (4)
 Jason Miles – co-producer (7)
 Tom Schuman – co-producer (10)
 Doug Oberkircher – recording, mixing 
 Scott Hull – mastering at Masterdisk (New York, NY).
 John Caron – production manager 
 Sonny Mediana – art direction 
 Sanae Robinson – design
 David Blankenship – photography
 Alan Nahgian – photography

Charts

References

External links
Spyro Gyra-Got The Magic at Discogs
Spyro Gyra official web site

1999 albums
Spyro Gyra albums